Finding Joy, In Search of Happiness or Searching for Happiness may refer to:

Drama
 В поисках радости ("Finding Joy"/"Searching for Happiness") is a 1957 play by Russian playwright Victor Rozov

TV and film
 Finding Joy, a 2018 Irish comedy television series written by and starring Amy Huberman
 Finding Joy, a 2013 film starring Josh Cooke
 Finding Joy, a 2002 Australian independent film featuring Angry Anderson
 In Search of Happiness (Russian В поисках счастья), a 2005 Russian documentary film directed by Alexander Gutman
 In Search of Happiness, a 2011 episode of Imagine, a British documentary series on the subject of Leo Tolstoy
 In Search of Happiness, a 1995 UK television series, presented by Angus Deayton
 In Search of Happiness with Angus Deayton with Lise Mayer, a 1995 book based on the series

Music
 Finding Joy, a 2002 EP by Hondo Maclean

Literature
 Authentic Happiness: Using the New Positive Psychology to Realize Your Potential for Lasting Fulfillment, a 2002 self-help book by Martin Seligman
 The Continuum Concept: In Search of Happiness Lost a book by photographer Jean Liedloff
 In Search of Happiness a 1962 poetry collection by Michael Ondaatje
 In Search of Happiness'' an album by Golden Melody Award for Best Vocal Group nominated Chinese vocal duo Crispy脆樂團